Britton "Britt" Payne (September 19, 1940 - June 24, 2020) is an American curler.

Payne is the son of his 1964 teammate, Bert. At the time of the 1964 Scotch Cup he worked in industrial relations.

Teams

References

External links
 

1940 births
2020 deaths
American male curlers
American curling champions
Sportspeople from Duluth, Minnesota